Kalacheyevsky District  is an administrative and municipal district (raion), one of the thirty-two in Voronezh Oblast, Russia. It is located in the east of the oblast. Its administrative center is the town of Kalach. Population: 57,242 (2010 Census);  The population of Kalach accounts for 35.0% of the district's total population.

References

Notes

Sources

Districts of Voronezh Oblast